The De Geer Land Bridge was a land bridge that connected Fennoscandia to northern Greenland. The land bridge provided a northern route from Europe to North America from the Late Cretaceous to the Early Paleocene, although this timeframe has been disputed. 

The De Geer Land Bridge provided a path from Scandinavia across the Barents Sea to Svalbard, northern Greenland, and northern Canada. This may have been possible due to the Barents Sea residing on the shallow continental shelf.

Relation to other land bridges
The De Geer Land Bridge was the initial route from Europe and North America.  Long after the De Geer Land Bridge disappeared, the Thule Land Bridge appeared and offered a more southern route from Europe to North America.

Beringia, a land bridge from Northeast Asia to Alaska, was another route to North America that existed at the same time as the De Geer Land Bridge.

References

Paleocene
Cretaceous
Landforms
Historical geology